Ron Rocco (born 1953, Texas, U.S) is an American artist who has worked in New York City, Rotterdam in the Netherlands, Berlin, Germany and China. His work entails performance, mixed media installations and sculptural constructions employing a mix of found objects and prepared elements.

Early life and education
As a child Ron Rocco traveled with his parents to Germany, where his father served as an American soldier in the post-war occupation army.  The artist attributed his early experience with German culture as a defining element in the background to his interest in Europe and his sometimes social and political themes.

In the late 1950s and '60s Rocco grew up in the Bronx in New York City. His was an ethnically Italian neighborhood, surrounding Arthur Avenue, known as the Little Italy of the Bronx.  The neighborhood scrap metal yards, inspired an early interest in working with metals, and a sense of the latent potential of found materials to evoke memory and associations.  Rocco went on to study the visual arts at Purchase College, State University of New York, with classmates Jon Kessler and Fred Wilson, studying with sculptor Tal Streeter, photographer and musician John Cohen and printmaker Antonio Frasconi.  Later he began graduate study at the Center for Advanced Visual Studies at M.I.T. under the instruction of the German Group Zero artist, Otto Piene, filmmaker Ricky Leacock, and anthropologist Heather Lechtman. Here Rocco began projects, which would result in his Guggenheim, New York performance entitled Zaroff’s Tale.

Early career
Rocco's earliest work in sculpture grew out of an interest in the tension generated forms, made famous by the American artist, Kenneth Snelson and German architect, Frei Otto. Rocco's work was based on arced segments of aluminum or wood, in constructions which displayed a balance between tensile and compression forces, subject to the effects of gravity.

His exploration of these structures appeared in the exhibition, Models for Large Sculpture, presented at the Arnot Art Museum in Elmira, New York and later in a solo exhibition at Toronto's Galerie Danielli.

Meketra a second large scale commission from this period was exhibited at Cornell University’s Herbert F. Johnson Museum of Art.

In the period of 1979-80, Rocco returned to New York City and it was during this time that he met and was influenced by the work of German artist, Joseph Beuys who was producing his solo exhibition at the Guggenheim Museum at the time. As a result of this new influence later work in tension sculptures began to encompass performance activities, employed string figures taken from Inuit and Oceanic sources; forms, which in their traditional context possessed a social facet, in the communication of communal beliefs and ritual.

Rocco used these as mechanisms for presentation to his audience in performance works like Zaroff's Tale Guggenheim Museum, New York), A String form for Binding Nations United Nations, New York) and  Laser Sculpture Dance Herbert F. Johnson Museum of Art in Ithaca, New York.

Work in performance and electronic media
Building on earlier work at M.I.T.'s Visual Language Workshop and Owego, New York’s Experimental Television Center, Rocco authored computer software to produce an early image processing system for video. His works "Plotzensee" (2000) and "Berlin Diaries" (2000) can be found in the Experimental Television Center Repository, in the Rose Goldsen Archive of New Media Art. This resulted in his 1985 collaboration with dance choreographer Mel Wong and The Mel Wong Dance Company.  Together they presented, Buddha Meets Einstein at the Great Wall during an American tour and at New York's Asia Society.

This presentation used dance in combination with pre-recorded and real-time computer/video image processing to explore varying perceptions of time from both an American and Asian viewpoint. It was a performance that New York Times dance critic, Jennifer Dunning called one of the most successful integration of video imagery and modern dance.

At the time, Rocco clarified, "The formal concerns of movement in dance could accentuate the effects of my equipment on the flow of time, providing a suitable format for the beauty and complexity of this subtle video processor".  This performance was funded by a 1984 Inter-Arts Grant from The National Endowment for the Arts and the Sony Corporation, and may well have been the first live, on-stage application of computer generated imagery for dance.

Other media projects in-residence at Canada's Banff Center in Alberta, involved musician David Hykes, of The Harmonic Choir. Together they developed a computer assisted laser/video work, which generated kinetic cycles of visual phenomena from Hykes's music. One such installation, provided real-time, graphic representation of sound, employing a laser scanner and a digitally processed, video feedback loop to create images that were abstract and strikingly calligraphic.  This appeared in the work, In Light of Sound, one of Rocco's Andro-Media Series installations, at the Cathedral of St. John the Divine in New York City. The New York State Council on the Arts funded event in collaboration Hykes and his Harmonic Choir used the two-thousand-year-old tradition of Mongolian overtone chanting, practiced by these musicians, to control the visual phenomena created by the system of scanning lasers, video displays and computer processor.

Working in the later 1990s, Rocco explored the potential of web based projects in works like Rabinal Achi/Zapatista Port Action of 1997, a collaboration with Ricardo Dominguez, for the M.I.T /List Center Gallery's exhibition PORT/Navigating Digital Culture, and Communicating Vessels with Dutch artist Arnold Schalks.

Rabinal Achi/Zapatista Port Action, was a fusion of drama and social commentary into a work spanning eight hundred years of Mayan History. Eight broadcast events were produced (via Pseudo Media in New York), bringing together news clips, interviews and discussion groups from Chiapas, Mexico, and the U.S. along with Mayan theater, for the List Gallery exhibition and the Internet.  Rabinal Achi/Zapatista Port Action was a composite work, and used a VRML bridge, to join live audio and video streams, chat groups and an enactment of the Rabinal-Achi, a classic Mayan theater work of highland Guatemala.

Communicating Vessels, was presented as a maritime contribution to the Snug Harbor Cultural Center's program in 1998. As a site specific and web based project located at the St. George terminal of the Staten Island Ferry, this project joined maritime subjects, navigation technology and historical documents to explored the relationship of Snug Harbor Cultural Center's past, as a home for retired seamen, to the present refuge for aged sailors in Sea Level, North Carolina. Through interviews with the residents of the North Carolina facility, Communicating Vessels presented the Atlantic Ocean as the connective element between the two locations via the Internet, using an information kiosk at the St. George site to present the web site, track ferry navigation via software provided by MapTech corporation, and to distribute newspapers and other publications.  Communicating Vessels, was funded by the Netherlands Consul to North America and CBK Centrum Bildende Kunst, Rotterdam.

Sculpture and European projects
Resident in New York 1979–1989 on the Lower East Side and later in Williamsburg, Brooklyn, Rocco's sculptural work focused on New York Real Estate as a defining force in the life experiences of artists.

Works like A Poet Dies on 12th Street and Eviction Plan stem from his experiences as a tenant organizer at this time, and document cases of murder and arson as side-products of these economic forces.

Focusing on the balance between the natural and man-made world, Rocco's 1989, Waterline Project in Amsterdam, Netherlands was created for the Dutch foundation ArtGarden.

The project consisted of three outdoor sculptures in a park-like environment, and commented on the Dutch accomplishment of redefining natural boundaries between earth and sea. The project was produced with the joint support of The Netherlands-America Foundation, Art Matters, The New York Foundation for the Arts and The Foundation for Contemporary Performance Arts, Martin Air Holland, Regency Art Transfer of New York and the generous assistance of the Dutch Consulate to the United States and The Department of Cultural Affairs of the City of New York.

The Horizon is Nothing More than the Limit of Our Sight, Rocco's 1990 installation for the Brooklyn Museum of Art in New York, in addressing the natural and man-made worlds used the horizon to define a perceptual boundary.

This installation implied the possibility of a new social awareness, by people sharing interests of greater ecological benefit. Confronting a video landscape, and traversing the maze of barriers which comprise this work, the spectator explores the conceptual limits, which isolate us from this awareness.

Other projects during Rocco's later European residencies at Künstlerhaus Bethanien and Die KünstFabrik in Berlin, Germany as well as Kunst & Complex in Rotterdam, Netherlands, resulted in exhibitions in 1991–93.  The Berlin Project, fruit of his work at Künstlerhaus Bethanien's International Studio Program, was a body of art works which identified distinct facets of Berlin's evolving social dynamic. The objects showcased, referenced the socialist realism found in eastern parts of the city, as well as commercial elements taken from the west. The project, part of which is housed in Berlin's Berlinische Galerie, utilized images taken from the streets and transit system of the city, as well as historical references, to reveal the new rules in an economic struggle beginning in the city at that time.

Private Parts, the product of his residency at Kunst & Complex in 1993, focused on self-examination, an examination defined as transcending the individual. This body of work, which delineated personal issues such as age, masculinity, and health, took on more global meaning, in the context of addressing questions of human frailty, genocide and social values during times of transition. In this body of work, Rocco often refers to elements of control and order, and environments bordering on social cataclysm, through images of sinking ships, deserted streets and disoriented swimmers.

He identified this work, “functioning as a diary of thoughts and images, from a year of painful transformation in Europe, posting warnings of all that is at stake in the search for peace and unification in Europe”.

Amerika

Perhaps because of long periods in residence outside the United States, or due to his earlier experiences in opposition to the Vietnam War, Rocco began to articulate a new view of American culture.

Structures of Detention, an edition of photo-silk screen prints on bound editions of The New York Law Journal, document a social dynamic between crime and punishment. Houses of Detention and Federal Buildings in New York City, provide the counterpoint to court proceedings and records outlined within each page's text. In these artworks there is a dialog established between the pages and these buildings, which provide an opportunity for social commentary and dark humor.

Other works like The Pursuit Series, drawings made from television images of police activity and 30 Minutes B & W photographs in an enlarged contact sheet format focus on an American fascination with representations of criminal behavior, policing, and criminal justice.

Post 9/11 as the U.S. began its ventures into war in Iraq and Afghanistan, Rocco's work became more critical of the escalating violence. Works like StarBlind and Bloody State confronted the blind march to war and its aftermath.  An installation work from the end of the decade Bail Out questioned the accounting that resulted in the rescue of Wall Street in a humorous work, which included an overturned accountant's ledger, the spilled cyphers, and a golden lined parachute with its requisite air blower.

The installation Shake Up! from his 2010 New York exhibition at Dam Stuhltrager Gallery, curated by Lynn del Sol is an artwork addressing issues of environmental degradation and the reality of Global Warming. It records the moment of shock; the rude awakening after a turning point. Shake Up! is the moment after the earth moves and we find ourselves in a hostile new environment. It also symbolizes the hoped for heed of the 'wake up call' to humanity.

China

In 2011, Rocco visited China for the first time. He explains the circumstances of his visit in this way, "In the 80's I worked extensively 
with dancer, choreographer Mel Wong and his dance company. During that time Mel invited me to visit him in Hong Kong, while he was an artist in residence in that city. Although fascinated by the prospect of visiting Hong Kong, at that time the visit was not possible. From that point on a deep regret at missing this opportunity began to develop. I promised myself I would not miss the next opportunity when one developed.

In 2011, such an invitation was offered and in keeping with my promise I came to Hong Kong. During that visit, on the suggestion of a friend, I took a ferry to Zhuhai, China. It is no exaggeration to say my interest in relocating to Zhuhai was like love at first sight."

Once in China new possibilities appeared. Rocco completed a master's study in Spatial Design at the University of St. Joseph in Macau, and in his thesis he discusses the developments of this period. Key to this was an interest in teaching. Rocco says he reflected on the words of Joseph Beuys when Beuys said, “Teaching is my greatest work of art…the rest is the waste product, a demonstration. If you want to express yourself you must present something tangible. But after awhile this has only the function of a historic document. Objects aren’t very important any more. I want to get to the origin of matter, to the thought behind it.” (Artforum magazine interview with Willoughby Sharp in 1969). "Beuys saw the role of an artist as a teacher or shaman who could guide society in a new direction.” (Sotheby's catalog, 1992).

To Rocco, it was clear Beuys chose the classroom as his canvas in orchestrating an open forum for intellectual exchange and frequently applied “philosophical concepts to his pedagogical practice.” (Beuys). Rocco began teaching in China, combining art concepts with other interests in guiding his students to further their future success. In 2014, Rocco met and began working with a local architect, Josh Wu, consulting on several projects Wu was engaged in. Since then, they have together completed several architectural projects in Zhuhai, which include the interior design of the G Flowers store in the city's Gongbei district, an exterior and interior redevelopment of a building for the Contemporary Music Institute in Beishan, and most notably the redesign of a 400 year old ancestral hall in the same Beishan village for the Chengchuan Art Gallery.

Selected solo exhibitions
 CTS creative thriftshop /Dam Stuhltrager Gallery, Brooklyn, New York (2010)
 Hudson Guild, New York, New York (2004)
 Galerie Völcker & Freunde, Berlin, Germany (2002)
 University Gallery /University of Massachusetts, Lowell, Massachusetts (1999)
 Warehouse Galerie, Amsterdam, Netherlands (1993)
 Künstlerhaus Bethanien, Berlin, Germany (1991)
 Amerika Haus, Berlin, Germany (1991)
 Foundation Artgarden, Amsterdam, Netherlands (1989)
 Museum of Modern Art /P.S.1, Long Island City, New York (1987)
 Solomon R. Guggenheim Museum, New York, New York (1983)
 Gallery Danielli, Toronto, Ontario, Canada (1979)
 Herbert F. Johnson Museum, Ithaca, New York (1979)
 Arnot Art Museum, Elmira, New York (1976)

Selected group exhibitions
2008 IPCNY /International Print Center, New York, ArtForum 2008 Berlin, Germany 
2007 Supermarkt 2.0, Berlin, Germany, 
2006 Visual Arts Center of New Jersey, Summit, New Jersey, Künst & Complex, Rotterdam, Netherlands, Stone Quarry Hill Art Park, Cazanovia, New York
2004 Scope /New York Galerie Völcker & Freunde, New York, New York, Scope /Miami Galerie Völcker & Freunde, Miami, Florida, Rockland Center for the Arts, Nyack, New York
2001    Collaborative Concepts, Beacon, New York, Hudson Guild, New York, New York
2000    Islip Art Museum/Anthony Giordano Gallery, Islip, New York, Galerie Völcker & Freunde, Berlin, Germany 
1999    Campo & Campo, Antwerp, Belgium, Galerie Völcker & Freunde, Berlin, Germany
1998    Snug Harbor Cultural Center, Staten Island, New York
1997    Brooklyn Museum of Art,  Brooklyn, New York, Herbert and Vera List Center at M.I.T. Cambridge, MA.
1996    Rotunda Gallery, Brooklyn, New York, Neuberger Museum of Art, Purchase, New York, Sylvia White Gallery, New York, New York
1995    ISEA95, Montreal, Quebec, Canada
1992    Galerie Schoen+Nalepa, Berlin, Germany 
1991    Fundaçao Demócrito Rocha, Fortalesca, Brazil
1990    Katonah Museum of Art, Katonah, New York, Brooklyn Museum of Art, Brooklyn, New York
1989    University Art Gallery, SUNY at Albany, New York
1987    Brooklyn Art and Cultural Assoc., Brooklyn, New York, Morris Museum, Morristown, New Jersey, P.S.1 -MOMA/Institute for Art and Urban Resources, New York, New York, Banff Center, Alberta, Canada 
1986    CAD/CAM International Exhibition of Computer Artforms, Kortijk, Belgium, Cathedral of St. John the Divine, New York, New York
1985    Asia Society, New York, New York, Video Image Invitational, Foundation Georgio Ronchi, Capri, Italy, Bronx Museum of Art, Bronx, New York
1983    United Nations, New York, New York
1981    Pratt Institute, Brooklyn, New York, Herbert F. Johnson Museum, Ithaca, New York
1980    Gallery Danielli, Toronto, Ontario, Canada
1979    The Showing Room, New York, New York, IV Biennale Internazionale Dantesca, Ravenna, Italy
1978    Middendorf /Lane Gallery, Washington, D.C., Herbert F. Johnson Museum of Art, Ithaca, New York
1975    Roy R. Neuberger Museum, Purchase, New York

Awards and sponsorship
Kur-World Cup | Environmental Award for Architecture & Design
Art Matters Foundation
CBK Centrum Bildende Künst-Rotterdam
The Creative and Performing Arts Council of  Cornell University
Foundation for Contemporary Performance Arts
The Netherlands Consul for North America
The Netherland-America Foundation
The National Endowment for the Arts / Interdisciplinary Arts Program
New York Foundation for the Arts /Awards in Sculpture and Printmaking
New York State Council on the Arts /Individual Artist Program and Sponsored Projects
Sculpture Award of the Ithaca Art Association

References (on-line)
Leonardo Magazine: The Horizon is Nothing More than the Limit of Our Sight, and The Berlin Diary.
Luminous Bodies exhibition curated by Dara Meyers Kingsley.
Luminous Bodies 1996 Dara Meyers-Kingsley,guest curator
New York Times, Art in Review; Luminous Bodies exhibition Review by Holland Cotter  Published: October 4, 1996
New York Times, Art Review; Ahab's Wife, Ignored in 'Moby-Dick,' Tries Again by Ken Johnson Published: August 28, 1998
UCSC  /Mel Wong Choreography commissions Buddha Meets Einstein at the Great Wall
New York Times, Dance  Review;: 'Laser Sculpture' by Jennifer Dunning Published: May 26, 1981, Tuesday
MIT Press, Digital Zapatistas by Jill Lane; Summer 2003, Vol. 47, No. 2 (T178), Pages 129-144. Posted Online March 13, 2006. © 2003 New York University and the Massachusetts Institute of Technology
New York Times, Art Review; Inaugural Exhibition For Gallery in Beacon by D. DOMINICK LOMBARDI Published: April 22, 2001
Artnews.org: Ron Rocco
Hudson Guild, New York, New York
Rockland Center for the Art /Digital and Beyond
Solomon R. Guggenheim Museum Archives Collections: Department of Public Affairs press releases, 1952-2012
Video History Project /Experimental Television Center
Solomon R. Guggenheim Museum, New York, New York Museum Library and Archives Catalog
New York Times, Dance  Review: WORK BY MEL WONG By JENNIFER DUNNING Published: April 1, 1985
Ecological Art: Ron Rocco
Stone Quarry Hill Art Park: Ron Rocco
Intelligent Agent April/May 1997 Intellectual Properties by Robbin Murphy

References (off-line)
Zhuhai Magazine, May 2017 issue 367, "Space" a review of the Chengchuan Art Gallery.
Among the Trees, Visual Arts Center of New Jersey exhibition catalog, Summit, New Jersey April 2006.
The New York Times Arts & New Jersey Footlights March 26, 2006  Among the Trees
Sunday Star Ledger March 26, 2006  Among the Trees
Inaugural Invitational, Collaborative Concepts exhibition catalog, Beacon, New York. May 2001.
Twenty-Six American Artists, Campo & Campo exhibition catalog, September 1999
New York Times Arts & Entertainment April 22, 2001 Inaugural Invitational at Collaborative Concepts, Beacon, New York
Luminous Bodies, The Rotunda Gallery exhibition catalog, September 1996.
Warehouse Galerie, Amsterdam, Netherlands  Ron Rocco  Private Parts - Rotterdam 1993
Leonardo Magazine, Vol.26 #4 1993  New Horizons: Notes on a Video Installation
Fundaçao Demócrito Rocha,  Fortalesca, Brazil 1991.  Exposiçao Internacional de Escúlturas Efêmeras
Kunstlerhaus Bethanien, Berlin, Germany.  Ron Rocco  The Berlin Project 1991
Plus, Minus, Zero  Brussel, Belgium  Dec. 1991  Le Projet Berlin
Berliner Morgenpost,  Dec.17, 1991  Kunst-Splitter: Amerika Haus
Brandenburg Kurier, Dec.13, 1991  Neue Ausstellung: Ron Rocco / The Berlin Project
The New York Times, Friday, Dec.28, 1990  Exhibition in Katonah: The Machine as Muse
The Danbury New Times,  Vol.8/Issue 46 Nov.17, 1990  Art and Technology
The Katonah Museum of Art, Katonah, New York 1990  The Technological Muse
Working in Brooklyn / Installations, The Brooklyn Museum exhibition catalog, Brooklyn, New York October 1990
The Phoenix, Brooklyn, New York  August 9, 1990  Art Made in Brooklyn
New York Newsday, Tuesday, Aug.7, 1990  Installations with Twists of their Own
Greenline, Brooklyn, New York May 1990  "Celebration" - Artists Exhibit in Local Lofts
The Netherland-America Foundation, New York, New York  Annual Report 1989
Newark Star Ledger, April 26, 1987,  Art: Morris Exhibit Interfaces Art and Modern Science
The Arizona Republic, Dimitri Drobatschewsky Nov.22, 1986  East meets West
Beaux Arts Magazine,  No.26 Juil/Aout 1985  Video a Capri
The New York Times, Monday April 4, 1985  Art from All Corners: Buddha Meets Einstein
The Guggenheim Museum, New York, New York  Annual Report 1983
The New York Times, Tuesday, Sept.6, 1983  Suspense Story
The New York Times, May 26, 1981, Ron Rocco/Laser Sculpture Dance
High Performance Magazine, Issue 17-18/Vol.5 #1 Summer 1982  Ron Rocco/Laser Sculpture Dance 1981
Edizioni del Centro Dantesco, Ravenna, Italy Ottobre 1979  L’Inferno di Dante e dell ‘Uomo Moderno
The Times Gazette, Ithaca, New York March 11, 1978. Inside Art: New Ithaca Gallery Shows Two Sculptors
The Times Gazette, Ithaca, New York April 14, 1977. Art Ron Rocco: Physically Sound

References

Living people
1953 births
American photographers
Laser art
State University of New York at Purchase alumni
Artists from the Bronx
Artists from New York City
20th-century American sculptors
20th-century American male artists
21st-century American sculptors